Den norske los (literally The Norwegian Pilot) is an eight-volume book published by the Norwegian Mapping and Cadastre Authority. It provides supplementary information to charts for shipping crew. The book is obligatory for all vessels required to register. The first volume covers general information, while the remaining volumes cover specific geographic areas.

References

Norwegian books